Dusun Witu, or Witu, is a language spoken by the Dusun Witu people of Borneo specifically in Kalimantan Tengah Province, South Barito regency, near Pendang and Buntokecil towns; south of Muarateweh town in Indonesia. It is closely related to the Malagasy language spoken on Madagascar.

References 

East Barito languages
Languages of Indonesia
Endangered Austronesian languages